Grigory Khlinovsky is a former international speedway rider from the Soviet Union.

Speedway career 
Khlinovsky reached the final of the Speedway World Championship on three consecutive years, in the 1972 Individual Speedway World Championship, 1973 Individual Speedway World Championship and the 1974 Individual Speedway World Championship. He was one of six Russians that competed in the 1972 World final after strong performances in the Continental final and European final.

He was the senior coach of "Signal" team (Rivne) (1982-1989). Under his leadership "Signal" became the champion of the USSR for three times in a row (1985-1987). He was the senior coach of KAMAZ (Rivne) in 1990 and Signal (Rivne) in 1991. He is the honored coach of Ukraine, referee of the national category.

World final appearances

Individual World Championship
 1972 –  London, Wembley Stadium – 13th – 4pts
 1973 –  Chorzów, Silesian Stadium – 5th – 10pts
 1974 –  Gothenburg, Ullevi – 10th – 6pts

World Pairs Championship
 1974 –  Manchester, Hyde Road (with Vladimir Gordeev) – 6th – 10pts

World Team Cup
 1971 -  Wroclaw, Olympic Stadium (with Vladimir Smirnov / Vladimir Gordeev / Viktor Trofimov / Anatoly Kuzmin) - 2nd - 22pts (8)
 1972 -  Olching, (with Anatoly Kuzmin / Viktor Trofimov / Viktor Kalmykov) - 2nd - 21 + 7 pts (5 + 1)
 1976 -  London, White City Stadium (with Viktor Trofimov / Valery Gordeev / Vladimir Gordeev / Vladimir Paznikov) - 4th - 11pts (2)

References 

Russian speedway riders
Living people
Year of birth missing (living people)